Moigny-sur-École is a commune in the Essonne department in Île-de-France in northern France.

Inhabitants of Moigny-sur-École are known as Moignacois.

See also
Communes of the Essonne department

References

External links

Official website 

Mayors of Essonne Association 

Communes of Essonne